The Wertach is a river in Bavaria, southern Germany, a left tributary of the Lech. The Wertach originates in the Northern Limestone Alps in Bad Hindelang, east of Sonthofen (district Oberallgäu). It flows north along the towns Wertach, Nesselwang, Marktoberdorf, Kaufbeuren, Schwabmünchen and Bobingen. The Wertach flows into the Lech (itself a tributary of the Danube) in Augsburg.

See also 
 List of rivers of Bavaria

Sources 
 Nowotny, Peter (2001). An den Ufern der Wertach. Immenstadt 2001, .

References

Rivers of Bavaria
Augsburg
Augsburg (district)
Ostallgäu
Unterallgäu
Rivers of Germany